Frank Poole Dyall (3 February 1870– 8 May 1950), professionally known as Franklin Dyall, was an English actor. In his early years he was a member of the companies of the actor-managers George Alexander, Ben Greet, John Martin-Harvey and Johnston Forbes-Robertson. During a 50-year stage career he played a wide range of parts in plays from Shakespeare to modern comedy, grand guignol, swashbuckling costume drama and the works of Ibsen. He broadcast on radio and television and made more than 20 films. He was the father of the actor Valentine Dyall.

Life and career

Early years
Dyall was born in Liverpool on 3 February 1870, the youngest of four sons of Charles Dyall, first curator of the Walker Art Gallery, and his wife Margaret Oliphant née Robertson. He was educated at the Liverpool Institute High School for Boys. He made his professional stage debut in April 1894 in George Alexander's company at the St James's Theatre, London, in The Masqueraders by Henry Arthur Jones. In his early career he appeared under his real name, and as Frank Dyall he played a servant in Alexander's production of Henry James's Guy Domville in January 1895 and created the role of Merriman in The Importance of Being Earnest the following month.

Dyall's first Shakespearean roles were Claudius in Hamlet, and the Duke in The Merchant of Venice in Ben Greet's company at the Olympic Theatre in May 1897. Claudius was a role to which he returned during his career, playing it to the Hamlet of John Martin-Harvey in 1911 and John Gielgud in 1935. He joined Johnston Forbes-Robertson at the Lyceum later in that year, playing Guildenstern in Hamlet and Second Witch in Macbeth the following year ("satisfactory, though we should prefer female witches", said The Era). He appeared at the Prince of Wales’s Theatre in June 1898 as the Doctor in Mrs Patrick Campbell's production of Pelléas and Mélisande.

Early 20th century

In the early years of the 20th century Dyall appeared in Lewis Waller's company, and played a variety of roles, both Shakespearean and modern. In 1905–06 he toured the US in E. S. Willard's company. After returning to England, he married the actress Mary Phyllis Logan, known professionally as Concordia Merrel. They had one child, Valentine, who followed his parents into the acting profession. At about the same time Dyall changed his stage name from Frank Dyall to Franklin Dyall, He acted in a wide range of roles, including several Ibsen parts, playing the title role in John Gabriel Borkman (1910), Dr Rank in A Doll's House and  Judge Brack in Hedda Gabler (both 1911). Of the first of these the reviewer of The Illustrated London News called Dyall's performance "splendid ... the actor has done nothing half so good heretofore and his was ... the best performance we have ever had in London of his role".

In 1914 Dyall returned to North America, touring Canada and the US with Marie Tempest's company, playing roles including Richard Whichello in Mary Goes First and James Crane in  At the Barn. The New York Tribune found his performances "easy, natural and enjoyable".<ref>"Marie Tempest in 'At the Barn'", The New York Tribune, 1 December 1914, p. 9</ref> He remained in the US in early 1915, playing the paterfamilias in a new comedy, The Younger Generation, by Stanley Houghton. After returning to London he appeared with Martin-Harvey at His Majesty's in 1916, as Laertes in  Hamlet, Lucentio in The Taming of the Shrew, Richmond in Richard III, and the Duke of Exeter in Henry V. In 1918, in partnership with the actress Mary Merrall, he ran the Abbey Theatre, Dublin, for the summer season.

Inter-war years
In his middle years Dyall had many successes playing what The Times called "saturnine villains in modern melodramas":

Between 1918 and 1939 Dyall played five Shakespearean roles: Friar Lawrence in Romeo and Juliet (1919), Pistol in Henry V,  Cassius in Julius Caesar, Shylock in The Merchant of Venice (all 1934), and Claudius with Gielgud (1935). Between these his appearances ranged from grand guignol (1922), to another Ibsen lead (Solness in The Master Builder (1931) as well as swashbuckling roles such as Duke Michael in The Prisoner of Zenda and Captain Hook in Peter Pan (both 1923).
In 1928 he and his first wife were divorced, and the following year he married Mary Merrall, with whom he had been living for several years.

Last years
At the Shaftesbury Theatre in 1940 Dyall played Andrew Bevan in Behind the Scenes. The following year he played Sir Valentine in The Devil's Sanctuary, and for ENSA he toured for five months as Weston in White Cargo. He toured in 1943, in The Strange Case of Margaret Wishart, and was back in the West End later that year as Vasin in The Russians at the Playhouse, and, in the Christmas season, the Caterpillar and the King of Hearts in Alice in Wonderland at the Scala. His final stage appearances were on tour in 1944 and 1945, in The Case of the Frightened Lady, The Frog, and The Ringer, and finally as Svengali in Trilby.

Dyall died at his home in High Salvington, Worthing, Sussex on 8 May 1950 at the age of 80. He was buried in the churchyard at Thaxted Parish Church in Essex.

Radio and television
Dyall was an early broadcaster in both radio and television. For 2LO, London, he and Forbes-Robertson gave a Shakespearean recital in May 1925, and in August 1939 he headed the cast in two live television transmissions of The Ringer. Other than these, he made few broadcasts until the 1940s, when he appeared frequently in the series Appointment with Fear. When television resumed after wartime suspension Dyall once again made two live broadcasts in The Ringer, and in the late 1940s he played a wide range of parts on radio, including John Gabriel Borkman, the Dream Chronicler in A Yank at the Court of King Arthur, Joseph Haydn in Papa Haydn, Anselm in The Miser, Jaggers in Great Expectations, Don Fernando in Henry de Montherlant's The Master of Santiago and, his final role, Gardiner, the Lord Chancellor, in Tyrone Guthrie's adaptation of Tennyson's Queen Mary'', broadcast in July 1950 after his death.

Films

Dyall appeared in, produced or directed 26 films between 1916 and 1948.

Notes, references and sources

Notes

References

Sources

External links
 

1870 births
1950 deaths
Male actors from Liverpool
English male film actors
English male silent film actors
20th-century English male actors
People educated at Liverpool Institute High School for Boys